André Oliveira Silva (born 3 June 1997) is a Brazilian footballer who plays as a winger for Portuguese club Vitória de Guimarães.

Club career

Rio Ave
Born in Taboão da Serra, São Paulo state, Silva began playing with local Diadema before joining Rio Ave F.C. in Portugal. He was first called up for a senior game on 3 February 2018, remaining unused in a 5–1 Primeira Liga loss at S.L. Benfica. His debut came the following 28 January in a 2–0 win at C.S. Marítimo, as a 67th-minute substitute for compatriot Murilo; he and another Brazilian Ronan had been called up by manager Daniel Ramos due to shortages through injuries and transfers.

Arouca
In 2019, Silva joined F.C. Arouca in the third-tier Campeonato de Portugal. He played 12 games as the team were promoted having led their group when the season was cancelled due to the COVID-19 pandemic; he scored once, the first senior goal of his career, in a 9–0 home win over bottom side Ginásio Figueirense on 8 March 2020.

Silva scored eight goals in 27 games as Arouca came third in Liga Portugal 2 in 2020–21; this included two on 21 February 2021 in a 4–0 win at Académico de Viseu FC. On 26 May, in the Primeira Liga promotion/relegation playoff first leg at home to former club Rio Ave, he concluded a 3–0 win (5–0 aggregate). 

Arouca came 15th on their return to the top flight in 2021–22, two points above a relegation play-off place. Silva played 31 of 34 games, all but one as a starter, and scored nine goals, a record for a player from his club in one Primeira Liga season; the previous best was Walter González with seven in 2015–16. He opened and closed the scoring in a 2–2 draw at C.D. Tondela on 19 March 2022, and scored twice in four second-half minutes in a 2–1 win over Gil Vicente F.C. on 2 April at the Estádio Municipal de Arouca; for his second goal of that game, he lobbed goalkeeper Žiga Frelih from 65 metres.

Vitória Guimarães
In the summer of 2022, S.C. Braga made an offer for Silva, that was far below his €5 million buyout clause. Their Minho rivals Vitória de Guimarães then signed him on 15 July, paying €1 million for 25% of the player's economic rights, with the option to increase the share to 80%; his contract was to 2026.

Silva made his debut on 21 July 2022 in his first European game, a UEFA Europa Conference League first qualifying round first leg at home to Puskás Akadémia FC of Hungary; he played the first 65 minutes of the 3–0 win (also the aggregate) before being substituted another Brazilian debutant, the unrelated Anderson Silva. He scored the only goal in the first two games of the domestic league season, to give his team victory at G.D. Chaves and at home to G.D. Estoril Praia in August.

References

External links
Soccerway profile
ZeroZero profile
Rio Ave profile

1997 births
Living people
Footballers from São Paulo (state)
Brazilian footballers
Association football midfielders
Rio Ave F.C. players
F.C. Arouca players
Vitória S.C. players
Primeira Liga players
Liga Portugal 2 players
Campeonato de Portugal (league) players
Brazilian expatriate footballers
Brazilian expatriates in Portugal
Expatriate footballers in Portugal
People from Taboão da Serra